Ostúa River is a river of El Salvador and Guatemala.

References

Rivers of El Salvador
Rivers of Guatemala
International rivers of North America